The New General Catalogue object NGC 48 is a barred spiral galaxy located approximately 79.3 million light-years from the Solar System in the constellation Andromeda.

See also 
 Spiral galaxy 
 List of NGC objects (1–1000)
 Andromeda (constellation)

References

External links
 
 
 http://spider.seds.org/ngc/ngc.cgi?48
 http://spider.seds.org/ngc/ngc_fr.cgi?48
 http://spider.seds.org/ngc/revngcic.cgi?NGC48
 
 http://vizier.u-strasbg.fr/viz-bin/VizieR-S?NGC+48
 Базы данных про объекты NGC/IC

0048
00929
Intermediate spiral galaxies
Andromeda (constellation)
18850907